Eskolak (also Romanized as Oskolak and Eskalak; also known as Eshkalak, Eskowlak, and Uskalak) is a village in Rostamabad-e Shomali Rural District, in the Central District of Rudbar County, Gilan Province, Iran. At the 2006 census, its population was 839, in 227 families.

References 

Populated places in Rudbar County